Michele Stefano de Rossi (30 October 1834, Rome – 23 October 1898, Rocca di Papa) was an Italian seismologist. He was a younger brother to archaeologist Giovanni Battista de Rossi (1822–1894).

He received his education at the University of Rome, and during his subsequent career conducted research in the fields of archaeology, paleontology, geology, vulcanology and seismology. He studied the topography of catacombs, and collaborated with his brother on La Roma sotterranea cristiana (1864–1877).

In the 1870s he developed a seismic scale to reflect varying levels of earthquake intensity. Meanwhile, in Switzerland, independent of Rossi, limnologist François-Alphonse Forel (1841–1912) created a similar seismic scale. When the two scientists became aware of each other's work, a combined effort resulted in the Rossi–Forel scale for determining the intensity of earthquakes.

In 1874 he founded the Bullettino del Vulcanismo Italiano, a journal dedicated to the study of volcanoes and earthquakes.

Publications 
 Dell'ampiezza delle romane catacombe e d'una machina icnografica ed ortografica per rilevarne le piante ed i livelli, 1860
 Scoperte paleoetnologiche in Castel Ceriolo presso Alessandria, 1868
 Nuove scoperte nella necropoli arcaica Albana e l'aes grave fra le rocce vulcaniche laziali, 1871 
 La meteorologia endogena, 1879–82
 Programma dell' Osservatorio et archivio geodinamico presso il R. Comitato geologico d'Italia con istruzioni per le osservazioni, 1883.

References 
 Mommsen Lettere (biographical information)

Seismologists
Italian volcanologists
Scientists from Rome
19th-century Italian geologists
1834 births
1898 deaths